Dříteň is a municipality and village in České Budějovice District in the South Bohemian Region of the Czech Republic. It has about 1,700 inhabitants.

Administrative parts
Villages of Chvalešovice, Libív, Malešice, Radomilice, Strachovice, Velice, Záblatí and Záblatíčko are administrative parts of Dříteň.

History
The first written mention of Dříteň is from 1423.

Sights
In Dříteň there is a castle built in 1668–1674, which was created by the reconstruction of a burnt fortress from the 15th century. Since 2020, it has been used as the municipal office and post office.

References

External links

Villages in České Budějovice District